The Murrayfield Racers were an ice hockey team based in Edinburgh, Scotland who were founded in 1952 as the Murrayfield Royals before changing their name to the Murrayfield Racers in 1966. 

The team won the British Championship four times in four consecutive seasons from 1969 until 1972. The club was also the 1986–87 and 1987–88 British Ice Hockey League Champions and played in the BHL Premier Division from 1982 to 1995.

The Racers won the Northern League on seven occasions – in 1970, 1971, 1972, 1975, 1979, 1980 and 1980 and the Benson & Hedges Cup in 1993.

Well-known players of the late 70s/early 80s were:
12 John Hay, #8 Derek 'pecker' Reilly, #10 Duncan McIntyre, #4 Gordon Inglis, #14 Stevie Hunter & #7 Jim Pennycook. for the 1980–81 season, the introduction of Canadian 'Import' Alex Dampier began the rise to a new level for the Racers. Supplemented by youngsters breaking through from the youth development & other Canadians, the team went from strength to strength.
With ex-juniors Scott Neil, Moray Hanson, Paul Pentland, Paul Hand & Tony Hand playing alongside imports of note including Chris Kelland, Jim Lynch & Gordon McDougall, the racers continued to progress.
When Coach Alex Dampier moved to pastures new at Nottingham prior to season 85–86, Jim Lynch became Player/Coach and introduced a fresh-faced 21yo Canadian by the name of Rick Fera to Edinburgh, good times were to come.
The connection that Rick made with local forward Tony Hand was like a second sight and they proceeded to lift the team higher still with their goal-scoring exploits.

In the mid-90s the club became the Edinburgh Racers before folding due to financial issues in 1996.

The Murrayfield Racers brand was resurrected in 2018.

Sports teams in Edinburgh
Ice hockey teams in Scotland
Defunct ice hockey teams in the United Kingdom
Ice hockey clubs established in 1952
Ice hockey clubs disestablished in 1996
1952 establishments in Scotland
1996 disestablishments in Scotland